Uropterygius macularius is a moray eel found in coral reefs in the western Atlantic Ocean. It is commonly known as the marbled moray.

References

macularius
Fish described in 1825